Fauncetown is an unincorporated community in Crawford County, Pennsylvania, United States.

Notes

Unincorporated communities in Crawford County, Pennsylvania
Unincorporated communities in Pennsylvania